Vitória is a former civil parish in the municipality of Porto, Portugal. In 2013, the parish merged into the new parish Cedofeita, Santo Ildefonso, Sé, Miragaia, São Nicolau e Vitória. The population in 2011 was 1,901, in an area of 0.33 km².

Vitória is one of the four districts within the UNESCO World Heritage Classified Zone of Porto, the others being São Nicolau, Sé, and Miragaia. A major landmark of Vitória is the Clérigos Tower ("Torre dos Clérigos"). The Vitória district is bounded by the Cedofeita, Santo Ildefonso, São Nicolau, Sé, and Miragaia districts.

References

Former parishes of Porto